The Central District of Ijrud County is in Zanjan province, Iran. At the National Census in 2006, its population was 29,319 in 7,351 households. The following census in 2011 counted 31,656 people in 8,906 households. At the latest census in 2016, the district had 30,493 inhabitants in 9,341 households.

References 

Ijrud County

Districts of Zanjan Province

Populated places in Zanjan Province

Populated places in Ijrud County